Jora Singh (born 1 January 1979) is an Indian track and field athlete from Haryana who specializes in the decathlon. Jora held the Indian National record of 7502 points set during the Federation Cup held in New Delhi on 2 March 2006 before being broken by Bharatinder Singh in 2011. He broke Kulwinder Singh's previous mark of 7325 points, registered in Chennai in August 2005.

Personal bests
Jora Singh, Deputy Commandant (DC), highly energetic officer of the world's largest border guarding force ie Borders security force. As a coach , now he is training athletes for national and international games. He is a very nice and happy person all the time. His contribution to the nation is priceless.

References

External links

Living people
1979 births
Indian male athletes
Indian decathletes
Athletes from Haryana
Commonwealth Games competitors for India
Athletes (track and field) at the 2006 Commonwealth Games